The Colt M1877 was a double-action revolver manufactured by Colt's Patent Fire Arms from January 1877 to 1909 for a total of 166,849 revolvers.  The Model 1877 was offered in three calibers, which lent them three unofficial names: the "Lightning", the "Thunderer", and the "Rainmaker".  The principal difference between the models was the cartridge in which they were chambered: the "Lightning" being chambered in .38 Long Colt; the "Thunderer" in .41 Long Colt. Both models had a six-round ammunition capacity.  An earlier model in .32 Long Colt known as the "Rainmaker" was offered in 1877.

History
The M1877 was designed by one of the inventors of the Colt Single Action Army (M1873), William Mason, as Colt's first attempt at manufacturing a double-action revolver. It was the first successful US-made double-action cartridge revolver, and was offered from the factory in two basic finishes: nickel-plated or a blued with a case-colored frame. The shorter-barreled versions without the ejector rod were marketed as "shopkeeper's specials" for use as a concealable pocket pistol.

Neither "Lightning" nor "Thunderer" were Colt designations, nor used by the factory in any reference materials. Both terms were coined by Benjamin Kittredge, one of Colt's major distributors. Kittredge was responsible for the terms "Peacemaker" for the Single Action Army, "Omnipotent" for the Colt M1878 double-action (often known as the "Frontier" model), and nicknames for the various chamberings of the New Line models.

The M1877's early double-action mechanism proved to be both intricate and delicate, thus it was vulnerable to failure of self cocking. The design had a reputation for failure and earned the nickname "the gunsmith's favorite". Because of the intricate design and difficulty of repair, gunsmiths to this day dislike working on them. Gun Digest referred to it as "the worst double-action trigger mechanism ever made". Typically, the trigger spring would fail and this would reduce the revolver to single-action fire only. Outwardly, the Model 1877 shows a striking resemblance to the Colt Single Action Army revolver, however, it is scaled down slightly and much thinner in dimension. The bird's head grips were of checkered rosewood on the early guns and hard rubber on the majority of later-production guns.

The "Lightning" was the favored personal weapon of famous Manchester (UK) Victorian detective, and then head of CID, Jerome Caminada. Old West outlaw John Wesley Hardin frequently used both "Lightning" and "Thunderer" versions, and the "Thunderer" was the preferred weapon of Billy the Kid, even carried by him when he was killed by Pat Garrett in 1881. Doc Holliday was also known to carry a nickel-plated "Thunderer" in his waistband as an accompanying gun to his nickel-plated Colt 1873. Both had ivory or pearl grips.

In popular culture
The song "41 Thunderer" by Dave Carter and Tracy Grammer refers to such a gun.

References

External links
 The Colt Revolver in the American West—Model 1877 Lightning. TheAutry.org

Colt revolvers
Early revolvers
Double-action revolvers
Guns of the American West
1877 introductions

de:Colt Model 1877